F.C. Copenhagen Handball (or simply FCK Handball) was a Danish handball team, playing in Copenhagen. They had both a male and a female team, both playing in the best Danish leagues, the Danish Handball League (men) and Danish Women's Handball League (women). FCK Handball was owned by Parken Sport & Entertainment - the same company behind the football team, F.C. Copenhagen.

After the 2009–10 season, Parken Sport & Entertainment returned the license to Frederiksberg IF. The male team squad became a part of AG København.

Notable former players

Women's

  Matilda Boson 
  Madeleine Grundström 
  Johanna Wiberg 
  Katalin Pálinger 
  Anita Bulath 
  Emiliya Turey 
  Linn-Kristin Riegelhuth 
  Cecilie Leganger
  Chana Masson 
  Nadine Krause  
  Carmen Amariei 
  Tanja Milanović 
  Maja Savić 
  Camilla Andersen 
  Sofie Bloch-Sørensen 
  Marianne Bonde 
  Christina Pedersen 
  Mia Rej 
  Mette Vestergaard 
  Josephine Touray 
  Mette Melgaard 
  Christina Krogshede

External links
 Official website

Danish handball clubs
Defunct handball clubs in Denmark
Defunct sports clubs in Copenhagen
F.C. Copenhagen
2004 establishments in Denmark
2010 disestablishments in Denmark
Handball clubs established in 2004
Sports clubs disestablished in 2010